The Rio Tennis Classic is a professional tennis tournament played on hard courts. It is currently part of the Association of Tennis Professionals (ATP) Challenger Tour. The tournament takes place in Rio de Janeiro, Brazil. The event was cancelled due lack of sponsors in 2018 and returned with another venue and surface in 2021.

In 2022, the event had another change and is now held on the clay courts of the Rio Tennis Academy.

Past finals

Singles

Doubles

References

 
ATP Challenger Tour
Clay court tennis tournaments
Tennis tournaments in Brazil